Trachonurus is a genus of rattails.

Species
There are currently six recognized species in this genus:
 Trachonurus gagates Iwamoto & P. J. McMillan, 1997 (Velvet whiptail)
 Trachonurus robinsi Iwamoto, 1997
 Trachonurus sentipellis C. H. Gilbert & Cramer, 1897 (Shaggy whiptail)
 Trachonurus sulcatus (Goode & T. H. Bean, 1885) (Bristly grenadier)
 Trachonurus villosus (Günther, 1877) (Furry whiptail)
 Trachonurus yiwardaus Iwamoto & A. Williams, 1999 (Yiwarda whiptail)

References

Macrouridae
Taxa named by Albert Günther